The 2012 Carlton Football Club season was the Carlton Football Club's 149th season of competition, and 116th as a member of the Australian Football League.

After a strong start to the season which had Carlton sitting as premiership favourites after six weeks, performances declined and the team finished tenth out of eighteen teams in the 2012 AFL season, missing the finals for the first time since 2008 and resulting in the dismissal of senior coach Brett Ratten.

Club summary
The 2012 AFL season was the 116th season of the VFL/AFL competition since its inception in 1897; and, having competed in every season, it was also the 116th season contested by the Carlton Football Club.

As in previous years, the club's primary home ground was Etihad Stadium, with home games expecting to draw larger crowds played at the M.C.G., and with traditional home ground Visy Park serving as the training and administrative base. The club's two joint major sponsors, car manufacturer Hyundai and confectionery company Mars, were unchanged from 2011. Carlton had a full alignment with the Northern Blues in the Victorian Football League, allowing Carlton-listed players to play with the Northern Blues when not selected in AFL matches; the VFL club, known as the Northern Bullants until 2011, changed its name and colours to match Carlton's this season.

The club's membership campaign slogan for 2012 was "I am Carlton"; the slogan was launched in Round 24, 2011. The club set a new membership record of 45,800, passing the 2011 record of 44,136 in May; the club had expected to reach 50,000 members after the strength of early season sales, but fell short of this target.

Senior Personnel
Brett Ratten continued in his role as senior coach of the club, entering his fifth and final season appointed to the job. Ratten's contract was to have expired after the 2011 season, but after that season he was awarded a two-year extension which was to have seen him coach the club until 2013; this contract was ultimately terminated early at the end of the 2012 season, because the club failed to meet onfield expectations during the year.

Ratten's coaching panel for 2012 was joined by Western Bulldogs assistant coach Paul Williams, who had also served as the Bulldogs' caretaker coach for three matches at the end of the 2011 season. Williams was appointed to the new role of assistant coach in charge of midfield stoppages. Ruck assistant coach Matthew Capuano was given additional responsibilities in player development. Vic Country Under-18s coach Robert Hyde was appointed the Northern Blues senior coach on a part-time basis, however, he left the club at midseason, and development coach Darren Harris), who had been Northern Bullants coach in 2011, stepped back into the role for the remainder of the season.

Former club champion Stephen Kernahan continued as club president in the 2012 season, a position he has held since August 2008. General manager of football operations Steven Icke left the club at the end of the 2011, after serving in the role for five seasons. It has been speculated that Icke and Ratten did not enjoy a strong working relationship, and that Ratten's reappointment was in part responsible for Icke's departure. Icke was replaced by former club captain and premiership player Andrew McKay.

Chris Judd served as club captain for the fifth season, with Kade Simpson continuing as vice-captain. The leadership group was expanded from seven to eight players, with Jarrad Waite elevated into the group; the rest of the leadership group – Judd, Simpson, Andrew Carrazzo, Jordan Russell, Marc Murphy, Bryce Gibbs and Michael Jamison – was unchanged from 2011.

Financial position
Carlton posted an operating loss of around $680,000 in the 2012 season. It was the club's first loss for six seasons. This was attributed to a drop in crowds caused by poorer-than-expected onfield form, and severance payments to Brett Ratten and several of his assistant coaches when they were sacked with time remaining on their contracts following the season.

Squad for 2012
Flags represent the state of origin, i.e. the state in which the player played his Under-18s football.

For players: (c) denotes captain, (vc) denotes vice-captain, (lg) denotes leadership group.
For coaches: (s) denotes senior coach, (cs) denotes caretaker senior coach, (a) denotes assistant coach, (d) denotes development coach.

Playing list changes

The following summarises all player changes between the conclusion of the 2010 season and the conclusion of the 2011 season.

During trade week, both Setanta Ó hAilpín and Paul Bower requested to be traded, seeking more playing time than they had been receiving at Carlton, but ultimately Carlton did not engage in any trades. Bower was retained on the list, while Ó hAilpín was delisted; Carlton had not wanted to delist Ó hAilpín, but was forced to delist somebody due to AFL rules specifying that each club must make a minimum of three list changes after each season.

In

Out

List management

Season summary
The club ran a two-week preseason training camp for much of its playing list in Doha, Qatar, and a further week in Abu Dhabi, UAE, during October and November 2011. The camp was designed for high performance training: high ambient temperatures in the Middle East, and artificial high-altitude training facilities in Doha, were key reasons for the camp's location.

Pre-season matches
Carlton finished in outright last place out of eighteen teams in the 2012 NAB Cup, as the only team to lose all four roster matches; the club also lost the consolation practice match on NAB Cup Grand Final weekend to go through the entire pre-season winless. The result was made worse by the fact that none of Carlton's opponents were finalists from the 2011 Premiership Season; although, it was also partially redeemed by the fact that, with the exception of the second half against , in which Brisbane added nine goals to no score, all five matches were closely fought.

2012 NAB Cup

Home and away season
After finishing 5th in 2011, the club entered the season with expectations of reaching the top four in 2012; the club, and coach Brett Ratten, made the bold move of stating this expectation publicly throughout the offseason. Even after the winless preseason, Carlton entered the season as the fourth favourite for the premiership with punters, behind Collingwood, Hawthorn and Geelong. With wins in the first three rounds, including a ten-goal win against  in Round 3, Carlton became equal premiership favourites, and after six rounds sat second on the ladder with a record of 5–1.

However, the club then lost six of its next seven games to fall to tenth on the ladder with a record of 6–7 after Round 14, which brought intense speculation in the media about the future of Ratten's tenure as coach. Carlton won five of its next seven games to stay in contention for eighth place, but was eliminated in Round 22 after losing and seeing other results fail to fall favourably. The club confirmed in the week following Round 22 that Ratten's contract would be terminated one year early; Ratten remained to coach the final match before departing. The club finished with an even record of 11–11. Recently retired  coach Mick Malthouse, who was rumoured throughout the season to be the most likely replacement for Ratten should he have been sacked, was appointed as Ratten's replacement shortly after the season.

Across the season, Carlton finished with records of:
3–6 in nine games against the eight finalists, with two wins against  and one against ; but, after Round 8 the record was only 1–6.
5–3 in eight games against the four similarly placed teams (those who finished between 9th and 13th, all of whom won between ten and twelve games).
3–2 in five games against the bottom five teams.

Home-and-away ladder

Leading Goalkickers 
Eddie Betts was Carlton's leading goalkicker for the season, with 48 goals. It was the second time Betts had won Carlton's goalkicking, after first winning it in 2010.

Team awards and records
Game Records
Round 5 – Carlton's score of 10.5 (65) in its win against  was its lowest winning score in any game since Round 11, 1996.
Round 6 – 's score of 6.7 (43) was the lowest score conceded by Carlton since Round 5, 2004.

Other
 Round 3 – Carlton won the 2012 Richard Pratt Cup with its 60-point win over Collingwood. It was Carlton's first Richard Pratt Cup victory, in the fourth season of the trophy.
 Round 15 – Carlton won the 2012 Peter Mac Cup with its 23-point win over Collingwood.
 Round 15 – Carlton's win ended Collingwood's ten-match winning streak, which ran from Round 4 until Round 14.

Individual awards and records

John Nicholls Medal
The Carlton Football Club Best and Fairest awards night took place on 28 September. The John Nicholls Medal, for the best and fairest player of the club, as well as several other awards, were presented on the night.

John Nicholls Medal
The voting system for the John Nicholls Medal remained the same as it had been since 2008. In each match, the five members of the Match Committee awarded votes. Each committee member could award votes to up to eight players, and each player could receive up to ten votes from each judge. The player with the most total votes across all premiership season matches (including home and away matches and finals) wins the award.

The winner of the John Nicholls Medal was Heath Scotland, who polled 362 votes. It was Scotland's first John Nicholls Medal, having previously finished second in 2007. Scotland won narrowly ahead of Eddie Betts (353 votes). The top ten is given below.

Other awards
The following other awards were presented on John Nicholls Medal night:-
Best First-Year Player – Tom Bell
Best Clubman – Dennis Armfield
Spirit of Carlton Encouragement Award – Dennis Armfield
Women of Carlton Player Ambassador – Shaun Hampson
The Carltonians High Achiever Award – Heath Scotland
Blues Coterie "Most Determined" Award – Brock McLean
Inner Blue Ruthness Award – Brock McLean

AFLPA Awards 
For each of the AFLPA awards, one or three Carlton players were nominated following internal vote of Carlton players; Chris Judd was also nominated for the Best Captain award by default. None of Carlton's nominees won or placed in their awards.

Leigh Matthews Trophy (Most Valuable Player)
Eddie Betts (nominated)
Andrew Carrazzo (nominated)
Chris Judd (nominated)
Robert Rose Award (Most Courageous Player)
Kade Simpson (nominated)
Best First Year Player
Tom Bell (nominated)

Other awards
All-Australian Team
Eddie Betts was Carlton's only nominee in the 40-man squad for the 2012 All-Australian team. He was not selected in the final All-Australian team of 22.

Goal of the Year
Chris Yarran was the winner of the 2012 Goal of the Year, for his Round 1 goal in which he gathered a loose ball on the half-forward flank, evaded three opponents and skirted the boundary line before goaling from 50m.

The following Carlton players won the Goal of the Week during the 2012 season.
Goal of the Week:
 Chris Yarran, Round 1
 Marc Murphy, Round 2
 Jeff Garlett, Round 5
 Paul Bower, Round 6
 Eddie Betts, Round 11
 Chris Yarran, Round 15
 Levi Casboult, Round 21

Mark of the Year
The following Carlton players won the Mark of the Week during the 2012 season:
 Eddie Betts, Round 2
 Andrew Walker, Round 6
 Andrew Walker, Round 11

Other
 Andrew Carrazzo won the Richard Pratt Medal as best on ground in Carlton's Richard Pratt Cup victory over Collingwood in Round 3.
 At the post-season AGM, Eddie Betts and Jordan Russell were awarded life membership to the club in recognition of eight years service.

Player records
 Round 2 – Brett Ratten became the third person to both play and coach 100 senior games for the Carlton Football Club, after Ken Hands and Norm Clark.
 Round 16 – Kade Simpson (broken jaw) was missing from the Carlton team for the first time since Round 14, 2005, bringing to an end his streak of 158 consecutive games played.
Round 23 – Luke Mitchell, on his AFL debut, kicked a goal with his first kick.

Milestones

Northern Blues
In 2012, Carlton had a full alignment with the Northern Blues in the Victorian Football League, allowing Carlton-listed players to play with the Northern Blues when not selected in AFL matches. The Northern Blues played home matches at both Visy Park and Preston City Oval. It was the tenth season of the affiliation between the two clubs, and the first in which the VFL club used the nickname 'Blues'; until 2011, the club was known as the Northern Bullants. The VFL club adopted a navy blue and white guernsey similar to Carlton's this season; its traditional red and white colours were retained to be worn in matches at Preston City Oval, and when needed as a clash strip.

Vic Country Under-18s coach Robert Hyde was appointed the Northern Blues senior coach on a part-time basis at the start of the season, taking over from Carlton development coach Darren Harris. However, this arrangement lasted only until midseason, with Hyde leaving the club on 28 June after he and the Carlton Football Club agreed that his role could not be effectively carried out by a part-time coach. The appointment had been unusual in the first place, as the previous three Northern Bullants senior coaches during the period of the clubs' affiliation (Barry Mitchell, David Teague and Harris) had all been full-time coaches at Carlton. Harris stepped back into the VFL senior coaching role after Hyde's departure.

After sitting on the bottom of the VFL ladder at the time of Hyde's departure, the Northern Blues finished tenth out of thirteen with a record of 6–10, to miss the finals.

Footnotes
:1. Ratten also served as head coach in the final six rounds of 2007 as caretaker, before being officially appointed as head coach for 2008.

References

Carlton Football Club seasons
Carlton